Marcus Aurelius was a name used by men from the Roman Empire and afterwards. The earliest so called was the emperor Marcus Aurelius. It became widely spread following the Constitutio Antoniniana issued by emperor Caracalla in 212.

Ancient Rome

Roman emperors
 Marcus Aurelius Antoninus, or simply Marcus Aurelius, emperor from AD 161 to 180
 Marcus Aurelius Commodus Antoninus, emperor from 177 to 192
 Marcus Aurelius Antoninus, nicknamed Caracalla, emperor from 198 to 217
 Marcus Aurelius Antoninus, nicknamed Elagabalus, emperor from 218 to 222
 Marcus Aurelius Severus Alexander, emperor from 222 to 235
 Marcus Aurelius Claudius "Gothicus", emperor from 268 to 270
 Marcus Aurelius Claudius Quintillus, emperor in 270
 Marcus Aurelius Probus, emperor from 276 to 282
 Marcus Aurelius Carus, emperor from 282 to 283
 Marcus Aurelius Carinus, emperor from 283 to 285
 Marcus Aurelius Numerianus, or Numerian, emperor from 283 to 284
 Marcus Aurelius Valerius Maximianus, or Maximian, emperor from 286 to 305
 Marcus Aurelius Valerius Maxentius, emperor from 306 to 312

Other Romans

 Marcus Aurelius Cleander, freedman of Emperor Commodus
 Marcus Aurelius Verrianus, prefect of Roman Egypt in 188
 Marcus Aurelius Heraclitus, prefect of Roman Egypt in 215
 Marcus Aurelius Epagatus, prefect of Roman Egypt in 224
 Marcus Aurelius Zeno Januarius, prefect of Roman Egypt in 231
 Marcus Aurelius Marius, Gallic emperor in 269
 Marcus Aurelius Nigrinianus (anglicised Nigrinian), probably son of Emperor Carinus
 Marcus Aurelius Sabinus Julianus, Roman usurper against emperor Carinus or Maximian
 Marcus Aurelius Olympius Nemesianus, esteemed poet during the reign of the emperor Carus
 Marcus Aurelius Valerius Romulus, son of the emperor Maxentius
 Magnus Aurelius Cassiodorus Senator, formerly recorded as Marcus Aurelius Cassiodorus, Roman statesman and writer

People in other countries
 Marcus Aurelius Arnheiter (1925−2009), U.S. Navy officer
 Marcus Aurelius Roberto (1930−1986), member of the Ohio General Assembly

See also
 Aurelius (disambiguation)
 Aurelia (disambiguation)

Aurelii